Feuer is the German language word for fire. From its origins, the word "feuer" has made its way into contemporary use as a family name.

According to Israel's Diaspora Museum, the surname, Feuer, indicates that the ancestors of those bearing this name were the "shedders of light and wisdom" on their villages.

People
 Cy Feuer (1911–2006), American theatre producer, director, composer, and musician
 Debra Feuer (born 1959), American actress
 Donya Feuer (1934–2011), American dancer, choreographer, theater director and filmmaker.
 Ian Feuer (born 1971), American former professional soccer player
 Jane Feuer (fl. 1980s–2010s), American professor of film studies
 Lewis Samuel Feuer (1912–2002), American sociologist
 Mike Feuer (born 1958), American politician and lawyer
 Zach Feuer (fl. 2000s–2010s), founding member of the Zach Feuer Gallery
 Eduard Feuer (born 1936) Mechanical engineer and entrepreneur

Notes

See also
Feuer (disambiguation)